Ill Blu (stylized as iLL BLU) is a British record production duo, consisting of James Grant and Darius Ellington-Forde.

Career
Ill Blu began their career in 2008 following the release of "Frontline" by Princess Nyah; at the time, the members of Ill Blu went under the names J-Reel and Def1, respectively. Following the release of "Frontline", the two would adopt the name Ill Blu; in an interview, they would note that "iLL" represented the rawness of their beats and "BLU" represented their cool approach to making them.

Following their well received remix of Shystie's 'Pull it' in 2009.  iLL BLU quickly became sought after remixers and staples of the UK Funky House sound remixing for the likes of Roll Deep, Cheryl and Hot Chip, amongst many others. 

They would go on to cement their underground foundations releasing the "Blu Magic Riddim" and EPs Bellion/Dragon Pop on Kode 9’s Hyperdub and Meltdown on Jackmaster’s Numbers record label.

In 2014, Ill Blu signed to Island Records, releasing 2 EPs The Blu Magic Project & The Blu Oceans Project.

In 2018, iLL BLU signed to RCA. Their first single was "Chop My Money"; it featured Krept & Konan, Loski and ZieZie. The song was successful and was certified Silver by the BPI. 

They also produced ZieZie's "Fine Girl", which was certified Platinum by the BPI, and MoStack's "What I Wanna", which was certified Gold that year.

Ill Blu spent a large part of 2019 behind the boards producing for artists such Headie One, Hardy Caprio, C. Tangana, Young T & Bugsey, Not3s & IAMDDB; they also produced Mostack's single "Shine Girl" featuring Stormzy & majority of his debut album Stacko, which peaked at number 3 on the UK Albums Chart.

In 2020, the duo released “Magic”, featuring OFB, Bandokay & Double Lz. Blending UK garage and drill, the track samples the motif from Sticky's “Triplets”. "Magic" was certified Silver by the BPI. Following the momentum of “Magic”, they released “Dumpa” featuring M24 & Unknown T, fusing the elements of Drill, UK Garage & Dancehall. The chorus borrows vocals from Vybz Kartel's “Dumpa Truck”.

Following the tragic murder of George Floyd at the police brutality in America, iLL BLU felt compelled to highlight the injustice black people faced when dealing with the police in the UK.  In January 2021, Ill Blu released "Routine Check 2.0" featuring The Mitchell Brothers & Sneakbo alongside a documentary; the documentary gave several testimonies regarding racial profiling from black people, including Sneakbo.

On 2 April 2021, Ill Blu released The BLUPRiNT, their debut mixtape, which included features from Wretch 32, MoStack, Donaeo, Jillionaire, Geko, 169, Loick Essien & Aida Lae.

Discography

Mixtapes

EPs

Singles

Guest appearances

Production credits

Remixes

References

English electronic music duos
English record producers
Electronic dance music duos
Male musical duos
Record production duos
British record production teams
Island Records artists
RCA Records artists